Toufik Moussaoui (born 20 April 1991) is an Algerian footballer whp plays for Paradou AC.

In July 2017, Moussaoui was called up by Lucas Alcaraz to the Algeria A' national football team for a pair of CHAN 2018 qualifiers against Libya.

Career
In 2020, he joined CR Belouizdad.
In 2022, he joined OC Khouribga.

References

External links
 
 

1991 births
Living people
Algerian footballers
Algerian Ligue Professionnelle 1 players
Algerian Ligue 2 players
Paradou AC players
People from Hussein Dey (commune)
Footballers from Algiers
Association football goalkeepers
Algeria international footballers
21st-century Algerian people